Batman Adventure: The Ride is the name for a series of Batman-themed motion simulator rides installed at various Warner Bros.-branded parks around the world. The ride was first installed at Warner Bros. Movie World on the Gold Coast, Australia in 1992, before being installed at Warner Bros. Movie World in Bottrop, Germany and Parque Warner Madrid in Madrid, Spain in 1996 and 2002, respectively. The installations in Germany, Australia and Spain later closed in 2004, 2011 and 2014, respectively.

History
On 23 December 1992, Warner Bros. Movie World in Australia opened the US$9 million Batman Adventure – The Ride motion simulator ride. The ride was based upon Tim Burton's Batman films, the second of which was released earlier that year.

In 1996, Batman Abenteuer (Batman Adventure) opened with Warner Bros. Movie World in Germany. The ride was identical to the version that opened in Australia many years prior.

In 2001, Warner Bros. Movie World in Australia revamped their ride and renamed it Batman Adventure – The Ride 2. As part of this process the original live-action film was scrapped in favour of computer-generated high-definition film developed by Blur Studio and music by Mike Verta. The new film featured elements from four of the Batman films as well as the animated series franchise released before Batman Begins.

On 6 April 2002, a third installation of the ride opened at Warner Bros. Movie World Madrid (now Parque Warner Madrid) in their DC Super Heroes World section. The new animated film was utilised along with 3D technology. The ride operated under the name Batman: La Sombra del Murciélago (Batman: Shadow of the Bat) until its closure at the end of the 2014 season.

On 3 April 2004, Warner Bros. Movie World in Germany was acquired by StarParks. This acquisition resulted in various Warner Bros.-licensed properties being removed from the park including DC Comics and Looney Tunes. The following year, Movie Park Germany opened with Batman Adventure – The Ride being rethemed to Time Riders.

In September 2011, Warner Bros. Movie World in Australia announced that Batman Adventure – The Ride 2 would be closed on 15 October 2011 to make way for a new attraction. Its replacement, Justice League: Alien Invasion 3D, opened on 22 September 2012.

Ride experiences

Batman Adventure – The Ride (a.k.a. Batman Abenteuer)
Guests were admitted into Wayne Manor as Gotham City on a tour of the library before entering the Batcave. Guests would be given an overview of the storyline in these two pre-show rooms. The live-action film revolved around Batman's quest to save kidnapped children in Gotham City. Riders would experience the adventure from Batman's point of view (in the tracking module vehicle). The ride is strongly based on the Batman Returns movie, featuring appearances from the Penguin, Catwoman and the Red Triangle Circus gang.

Batman Adventure – The Ride 2 (a.k.a. Batman: La Sombra del Murciélago)
Guests were admitted into Wayne Manor as Gotham City Police Cadets on a tour of the library. Guests were shown a short video detailing WayneTech's latest developments such as the Gotham City Security Network and the new reconnaissance fleet of aircraft, similarly styled to the Batwing in the 1989 film. This clip was introduced by the chief of the Wayne Foundation, Lucius Fox. Just as Mr. Fox started explaining the new network, they were interrupted by an alert directly from Arkham Asylum, Gotham City's maximum security facility for the city's worst felons. He remarked that it's "probably a false alarm but it doesn't pay to take chances". Batgirl linked to the computer from the Batcave to find that all of Gotham's forces are converging on Arkham Asylum. The television screen would go blank. A guide would then open the secret bookcase revealing the Batcave entrance as you walk through the Batcave tunnel through to the grouping queues you may hear dripping water and murmurs of bats flying. As guests reach the end of the queue lines the guide announces "I now present to you the Gotham City security network". At this moment several doors would open to reveal the network. It included 14 minor video monitors and one huge projection screen in the middle as well as Batman's controls in front of the screen. There was an animatronic Batman who talks in the Batcave sitting at the desk with his back facing the audience. Guests were seated in the audience and witness a second pre-show video introducing the mission to retrieve the Whitney diamond, stolen earlier from the Gotham Museum of Art. This was stolen earlier by Catwoman and is used to power a freeze cannon operated by Mr. Freeze.

Guests were then split up into groups of 20 and admitted into separate simulators where the ride would take place. Once the ride began, guests were taken on a chase through the streets of Gotham City in the pursuit of the Joker, Catwoman and Mr. Freeze. As the ride featured sudden movements, it was not suitable for those who suffer from motion sickness. For this reason, Movie World operated the ride without the motion at least once a day. When guests exited the ride they were greeted with the set of the tracking module crashing in to the Penguin's Arctic World Lair.

Ride system
The ride system used for Batman Adventure – The Ride was developed by California-based McFadden Systems, Inc. who specialised in motion platforms for military-style flight simulators. Batman Adventure – The Ride was the company's first amusement ride. Guests were admitted into one of six vehicles which each seat 20 riders. Each of these vehicles were mounted on motion bases which allow six degrees of freedom.

Voice cast
 Kevin Conroy as Bruce Wayne / Batman
 Mark Hamill as The Joker 
 Adrienne Barbeau as Selina Kyle / Catwoman
 Michael Ansara as Dr. Victor Fries / Mr. Freeze
 Tara Strong as Barbara Gordon / Batgirl
 Mel Winkler as Lucius Fox

Reception
Following the opening of Batman Adventure – The Ride in Australia, Warner Bros. Movie World saw a record spike in attendance. Approximately 12,000 guests visited the park on 30 December 1992. This spike was attributed to the opening of the ride. By 1998, an average of 10,500 tours were being run by Warner Bros. Movie World every year. This number eventually peaked at 20,000 tours per year.

In 2003, Warner Bros. Movie World in Australia saw a drop in park-wide attendance numbers. This was attributed to the SARS outbreak and the Iraq War. The reduced attendance saw Warner Bros. Movie World begin alternating ride operations with Batman Adventure – The Ride 2 operating from 10am until 11:15am, and from 3pm to 5pm.

The popularity of the ride in Australia decreased in the late 2000s. Robert Niles of Theme Park Insider identified that the ride felt outdated and was in need of a major overhaul. On 15 October 2011, Warner Bros. Movie World closed the ride permanently.

See also
 2011 in amusement parks
 Batman in amusement parks
 Star Tours, a Star Wars-themed attraction at various Disney parks

References

External links

 The full ride video on YouTube

Amusement rides introduced in 1993
Amusement rides introduced in 1996
Amusement rides introduced in 2002
Amusement rides manufactured by McFadden Systems, Inc.
Amusement rides that closed in 2004
Amusement rides that closed in 2011
Animatronic attractions
Batman in amusement parks
Dark rides
Movie Park Germany
Parque Warner Madrid
Simulator rides
Warner Bros. Movie World
2000s 3D films
Animated Batman films
1992 short films
1992 films
2001 short films
2001 animated films
2001 films
1990s American animated films
2000s American animated films
3D short films
Warner Bros. Global Brands and Experiences attractions
Gotham City (theme parks)